The violaceous euphonia (Euphonia violacea) is a small passerine bird in the true finch family. It is a resident breeder from Trinidad, Tobago and eastern Venezuela south to Paraguay and northeastern Argentina. The bird's range in northern Brazil is the lower portion of the Amazon Basin and the adjacent Tocantins River drainage, with its northwestern limits from Brazil and the Guyanas, the eastern banks of the Orinoco River drainage in central Venezuela.

It occurs in forests, second growth and plantations of cocoa and citrus fruit. The ball nest is built on a bank, tree stump or cavity and the normal clutch is four, sometimes three, red-blotched white eggs, which are incubated by the female.

Adult violaceous euphonias are 11.4 cm long and weigh 14 g. The male has glossy blue-black upperparts and a deep golden yellow forehead and underparts. The female and immature are olive green above and greenish yellow below.

These are social birds which eat mainly small fruit and only rarely take insects. The fruits are mostly mistletoes, epiphytic cacti and Cecropia fruit which are suited for them because of their simple digestive tract. Along with insects, it has been seen to consume terrestrial snails in Brazil. The violaceous euphonia's song is a varied mix of musical notes, squeaks, chattering and imitation.

Members of the genus Euphonia are prized as cage birds and several are threatened by trapping, but this species benefits from its relatively inaccessible habitat.

References

Bibliography

External links
Violaceous euphonia videos on the Internet Bird Collection
Stamps (for Trinidad and Tobago) with range map
Violaceous euphonia photo gallery VIREO Photo-High Res

violaceous euphonia
Birds of the Guianas
Birds of the Amazon Basin
Birds of Brazil
Birds of Trinidad and Tobago
violaceous euphonia
violaceous euphonia